The 2010 BMW Open was a men's tennis tournament that was played on outdoor clay courts. It was the 95th edition of the BMW Open, and was part of the ATP World Tour 250 series of the 2010 ATP World Tour. The event took place in Munich, Germany, from 2 May until 9 May 2010.

The draw was led by the defending champion Tomáš Berdych,  Russian Mikhail Youzhny and Croatian Marin Čilić.

Entrants

Seeds

 Seedings are based on the rankings of April 26, 2010.

Other entrants
The following players received wildcards into the main draw:
  Mario Ančić
  Nicolas Kiefer
  Kevin Krawietz

The following players received entry from the qualifying draw:
  Thierry Ascione
  Peter Gojowczyk
  Pere Riba
  Alexandre Sidorenko

Finals

Singles

 Mikhail Youzhny defeated  Marin Čilić, 6–3, 4–6, 6–4
It was Youzhny's first title of the year and 6th of his career.

Doubles

 Oliver Marach /  Santiago Ventura defeated  Eric Butorac /  Michael Kohlmann, 5–7, 6–3, [16–14]

References

External links
Official website

 
2010 Bmw Open
Bmw Open
May 2010 sports events in Germany